Esteban Guillermo Ayala Ferrer (September 2, 1929 in Havana, Cuba - July 15, 1995 in  Havana, Cuba) was a Cuban painter and a member of the Grupo Antillano.

He studied in evening courses at the Escuela de Círculo de Bellas Artes attached to the Escuela Nacional de Bellas Artes "San Alejandro" in Havana. He studied advertising at the Professional Advertising School between 1954 and 1957, and went on to take classes at the Massachusetts Institute of Technology between 1956 and 1958 and at the Hochschule für Grafik und Buchkunst in Leipzig between 1962 and 1966.

In 1986 he was head designer of posters and music records covers at the Empresa de Grabaciones y Ediciones Musicales (EGREM) in Havana and graphic director of PM Records and the Pablo Milanés Foundation in 1992. In 1983 he was an assistant to Prof. Albert Kapr from the Hochschule für Grafik und Buchkunst in the Course on Book Design, Havana.

Collective Exhibitions
 1964 - "II Salón Nacional de Carteles Cubanos", Museo Nacional de Bellas Artes de La Habana
 1964 - the Bach International Contest, Germany
 1975 - Book Art Show, Moscow, Russia
 1979 - "1000 Carteles Cubanos de Cine. 20 Aniversario de la Cinematografía Cubana", Museo Nacional de Bellas Artes de La Habana
 1983 - "Exposición V Aniversario del Grupo Antillano en Homenaje a Wifredo Lam", Cuba
 1991 - "Olor a Tinta" in Galería Havana, Havana, Cuba

Awards
 1964 - First Prize;  Poster; Bach International Contest, Berlin, Germany
 1965 - Diploma of Honor/Bronze Medal; William Shakespeare Contest, Leipzig, Germany
 1971 - Bronze Medal of International Book Fair IB, Leipzig, Germany
 1975 - Gold Medal of International Book Art Show, Moscow, Russia

Collections
His works can be found in permanent collections of:
Casa de las Américas (Havana), Havana, Cuba;
Instituto Cubano del Arte e Industria Cinematográficos (ICAIC), Havana, Cuba;
Museo Nacional de Bellas Artes de La Habana, Cuba.

References
 Sujatha Fernandes; Cuba Represent!: Cuban Arts, State Power, and the  Making of New Revolutionary Cultures(Duke University Press, 2006)
 Judith Bettelheim; AfroCuba: Works on Paper, 1968-2003; San Francisco State University Gallery; 2005;

External links
 Cuba Grafica website article
 La Jiribilla website article 
 CubaArt website article 
 Comite ProGrafica Cubana website article 

1929 births
1995 deaths
Cuban painters
Modern painters
Cuban contemporary artists
Cuban people of Basque descent
Hochschule für Grafik und Buchkunst Leipzig alumni